For the Bible Tells Me So is a 2007 American documentary film directed by Daniel G. Karslake about homosexuality and its perceived conflict with Christianity, as well as various interpretations of what the Bible says about sexual orientation. The film premiered at the 2007 Sundance Film Festival.

Overview 
The film includes lengthy interview segments with several sets of religious parents (including former House Majority Leader Dick Gephardt and his wife, Jane, and the parents of Bishop V. Gene Robinson) regarding their personal experiences raising homosexual children, and also interviews with those (adult) children.

The film features an animated segment, "Is Homosexuality a Choice?", in which a summary of the then-current scientific theories about sexual orientation is given, such as homosexual behavior in animals. It is directed by Powerhouse Animation Studios and narrated by Don LaFontaine in one of his last non-trailer narration roles.

People profiled in film 
 Gene Robinson
 Jake Reitan
 Chrissy Gephardt
 Tonia Poteat
 Mary Lou Wallner

Critical reception
The film received positive reviews from critics. The review aggregator, Rotten Tomatoes, reported that the film received 98% positive reviews, based on 43 reviews. Metacritic reported the film had an average score of 73 out of 100, based on 11 reviews.

Following its premiere in competition at the Sundance Film Festival, For the Bible Tells Me So went on to win several prestigious festival awards, including the Katherine Bryan Edwards Human Rights Prize at the Full Frame Documentary Film Festival, and the Best Documentary Audience Awards at the Seattle International Film Festival the Provincetown International Film Festival, Outfest, the Milwaukee Film Festival, and many others.

On November 19, 2007, For the Bible Tells Me So was named by the Academy of Motion Picture Arts and Sciences as one of 15 films on its documentary feature Oscar shortlist. However, it did not make the final list of five nominated films as announced on January 22, 2008.

References

External links
 
 For the Bible Tells Me So at First Run Features
                                                                             
 
 
                            
 

2007 films
2007 documentary films
American documentary films
American films with live action and animation
Documentary films about Christianity in the United States
Documentary films about LGBT and Christianity
2007 LGBT-related films
Films about conversion therapy
First Run Features films
2000s English-language films
2000s American films
Gay-related films
Lesbian-related films
Films about suicide
Films about prejudice
Films about anti-LGBT sentiment
Documentary films about lesbians
Documentary films about gay men